The  2014 Rada' bombings occurred on December 16, 2014 after two car bombs exploded in Radda District, Al Bayda Governorate, Yemen killing as many as 31 people, including 20 children.

Bombings
Al-Qaeda militants were targeting Houthi militants. The first bomb struck a gathering point where a group of Houthis were located. The first car was filled with potatoes and had the bombs hidden underneath. The second bomb was intended to hit the home of Abdullah Idris, a Shiite rebel leader. The bomb did not make it far enough and blew up next to a bus that was carrying children home from school. Altogether, up to 31 people died from the bombings, including 20 children.

Reaction
The United Nations responded to the bombings, stating "The attack on the schoolchildren on Tuesday in Yemen and other countries aroused a great sadness and must not be allowed to continue."

References

2014 murders in Yemen
Attacks in Asia in 2014
Mass murder in 2014
Car and truck bombings in Yemen
Suicide bombings in Yemen
Terrorist incidents in Yemen in 2014
Terrorist incidents attributed to al-Qaeda in the Arabian Peninsula
December 2014 events in Yemen
Al Bayda Governorate
Yemeni Civil War crimes